Prabhāvakacarita is a Jain text devoted to history, composed by Prabhācandra, an acarya of the Svetambara tradition of Jainism in 1277–78. While Prabhāvakacarita is dedicated to the lives of Jain scholars of the Shvetambara tradition, it is often quoted in the context of contemporary history, often dealing with the time of Acharya Hemachandra. It is a major source of the information on the society in that era. Prabhāvakacarita includes a mention of use a parachute in ancient India.

Prabhācandra mentions that he was inspired by the Hemachandra's Parishisthaparvan, which is an appendix to the Trishahsthi-Shalaka-Purusha-Charitra which stops at the account of Vajraswami. Prabhachandra gives accounts of acharyas from the first century of the Vikram era to 13th century, concluding with the account of Hemachandra. It gives an account of 22 acharyas, including Vajraswami, Kalaka,  Haribhadra, Bapabhatti, Manatunga, Mahendra Suri (which includes an account of poet Dhanapala) and Hemachandra.  It concludes by including a prashati of the author himself.

Translations

References

Jain texts